The Pittsburgh Passion is a women's American football team based in the Pittsburgh metropolitan area. The franchise was formed in March 2002 and is currently owned by Teresa Conn, Anthony Misitano, and the estate of Franco Harris. The team is a part of the Women's Football Alliance, with home games played at West Allegheny High School in Imperial, Pennsylvania.

History
In 2003, the Passion played its home games at Belle Vernon Area High School. The team finished its inaugural season with a 2–6 record. The average attendance at each of their four home games that season was between 2,500 and 3,000 fans.

In 2004 season, the Passion changed its home stadium to Ambridge High School's Moe Rubenstein Stadium. The team improved its regular season record to 6–2, just missing the playoffs as a Northern Conference wildcard team. The Passion led the league in attendance for 2004 with crowds approaching 4,000 fans per game.

In 2005, the Passion carried an active roster of 55 players along with a practice squad.

Starting in 2006, the Passion have played its home games at George K. Cupples Stadium (formerly "South Stadium") in the South Side of Pittsburgh.

In 2007, the Passion recorded an undefeated regular season going 8–0. After winning all three of their home playoff games, the team improved to 11-0 after victories over Erie, the West Michigan Mayhem, and Cleveland. The team then won the National Championship Game on July 21, 2007, against the Columbus Comets by a score of 32–0.

In 2008, the Passion recorded their second consecutive perfect regular season, finishing 8–0, winning the North Atlantic Division title, and defeating the Orlando Mayhem in the Eastern Conference Semifinal.  However, they lost the Eastern Conference Championship to the Chicago Force by a score of 8–7, ending their 23-game winning streak that dated back to 2006.

In 2009, the Passion finished 7–1, good for the Eastern Conference wild card spot.  However, they lost the Eastern Conference Semifinal to eventual conference champion D.C. Divas 27–17.

In 2010, the Passion finished 4-4, missing the playoffs for the first time since 2006.

For 2011, the Passion joined the Women's Football Alliance.  They finished their inaugural regular season with a perfect 8-0 and won the Mid-Atlantic Division title before losing to the Chicago Force in the National Conference quarterfinal game.

In 2014 and 2015 they won the IWFL Championship in Rock Hill, SC

May 21, 2016 The Passion won the NFC Central North Division with this victory and it is their 6th Division title in team history.

Notable achievements
 First women's football franchise in history to broadcast games on a major television network (Fox Sports Net)
 First franchise to be featured in Sports Illustrated
 First franchise to be featured on ESPN
 Awarded a permanent fixture in the Heinz History Center's Western Pennsylvania Sports Museum in association with the Smithsonian Institution. 
 Won the Dapper Dan Charities Sportswoman of the Year Award for 2011–12. 
 Franchise was selected to host the WFA National Championship Game slated for August 4 in Pittsburgh.
 The W Bowl National Championship weekend, hosted by the Women's Professional Sports Services, on July 21–23, 2016 in Pittsburgh, PA.

Season-By-Season 

|-
| colspan="6" align="center" | Pittsburgh Passion (NWFA)
|-
|2003 || 2 || 6 || 0 || 4th Mid-Atlantic Division || --
|-
|2004 || 6 || 2 || 0 || 2nd North Mid-Atlantic || --
|-
|2005 || 5 || 3 || 0 || 9th North Division || --
|-
|2006 || 5 || 3 || 0 || 3rd North Central || --
|-
|2007 || 8 || 0 || 0 || 1st North Central || Won Northern Conference Quarterfinal (Erie)Won Northern Conference Semifinal (West Michigan)Won Northern Conference Championship (Cleveland)Won NWFA Championship (Columbus)
|-
| colspan="6" align="center" | Pittsburgh Passion (IWFL)
|-
|2008 || 8 || 0 || 0 || 1st East North Atlantic || Won Eastern Conference Semifinal (Orlando)Lost Eastern Conference Championship (Chicago)
|-
|2009 || 7 || 1 || 0 || 2nd East Mid Atlantic || Lost Eastern Conference Semifinal (D.C.)
|-
|2010 || 4 || 4 || 0 || 3rd East Northeast || --
|-
| colspan="6" align="center" | Pittsburgh Passion (WFA)
|-
|2011 || 8 || 0 || 0 || 1st National Mid-Atlantic || Lost National Conference Quarterfinal (Chicago)
|-
|2012 || 7 || 1 || 0 || 2nd National Division 3 || Won National Conference First Round (Detroit)Lost National Conference Quarterfinal (D.C.)
|-
!Totals || 66 || 24 || 0
|colspan="2"| (including playoffs)

* = current standing

Roster

2009

Season Schedule

2010

Season Schedule

2011

Standings

Season Schedule

2012

Standings

Season Schedule

Passion Defeat Atlanta 35-24 In 1st Round Of Playoffs

10 Pittsburgh Passion Players Named To WFA All American Teams

External links
 Official website
 WFA website

National Women's Football Association teams
Women's Football Alliance teams
American football teams in Pittsburgh
American football teams established in 2003
2003 establishments in Pennsylvania
Women's sports in Pennsylvania